A you is a lidded vessel that was used for liquid offerings by the Chinese of the Zhou  and Shang Dynasties. It sometimes lacks taotie in favor of smoother surfaces. Sometimes these vessels are zoomorphic, especially in the form of two owls back to back. Usually the handle of the you is in the form of a loop that attaches on either side of the lid, but it is occasionally a knob in the center of the lid. They can be quadruped or have a single base.

Gallery

Notes

References

External links
The great bronze age of China: an exhibition from the People's Republic of China, an exhibition catalog from The Metropolitan Museum of Art (fully available online as PDF), which contains material on You

Chinese bronzeware
History of Changsha
Ningxiang
Containers